Jianhua District is a district and the seat of the city of Qiqihar, Heilongjiang province, People's Republic of China. The name of the district comes from "Jianhua" factory.

Administrative divisions 
Jianhua District is divided into 5 subdistricts. 
5 subdistricts
 Zhonghua, Xidaqiao, Bokui, Jianshe, Wenhua

References

External links
Jianhua local district government website

Districts of Qiqihar